The 1942–43 LFF Lyga was the 22nd season of the LFF Lyga football competition in Lithuania.  Tauras Kaunas won the championship.

Kaunas Group

Vilnius Group

Šiauliai Group

Panevėžys Group

Sūduva Group
Sveikata Kybartai 3-0 Dainava Alytus

Jonava Group
LFLS Jonava

Žemaitija Group
Džiugas Telšiai

Quarterfinal
Gubernija Šiauliai 3-0 Džiugas Telšiai
LGSF Vilnius 3-1 LFLS Jonava
Tauras Kaunas 5-0 Sveikata Kybartai

Semifinal
MSK Panevėžys 2-1 LGSF Vilnius
Tauras Kaunas 5-1 Gubernija Šiauliai

Final
Tauras Kaunas 4-1 MSK Panevėžys

References
RSSSF

LFF Lyga seasons
1942 in Lithuanian football
1943 in Lithuanian football
Lith
Lith